Amitabh Shukla is an Indian film editor, working in Bollywood, most known for his work in films like Chakh De! India, Krrish, Holiday and Chalte Chalte. He was awarded the Filmfare Award for Best Editing in the year 2007 for his work in the film Chak De! India.

Early life and career
Born in Lucknow, he did a masters in Business Management from Xavier Institute of Management, Bhubaneswar majoring in finance and systems. Owing to a deep interest in filmmaking and video editing he further went to the prestigious Film and Television Institute of India, Pune from where he graduated in the year 1998.
His first major film was Shah Rukh Khan's Chalte Chalte which was released in the year 2003.

Film editing 
He is credited for editing several Bollywood movies like Bluffmaster!, Namastey London, Singh Is Kinng and many others. The film Chak De! India won him several accolades across various award ceremonies including Filmfare and IIFA.
He has worked as head of the technical editing department at Red Chillies Entertainment and is a visiting faculty at the Film and Television Institute of India.

Filmography

Awards 
 Filmfare Award for Best Editing (2008) for Chakh De! India
 Guild Award for Best Editing for Chakh De! India
 IIFA Award for Best Editing for Chakh De! India
 Zee Cine Award for Best Editing for Chakh De! India
 The National Film Award for Best Promotional Film (2010) for Lost and Found

References 

Living people
Hindi film editors
Artists from Mumbai
Year of birth missing (living people)
Film editors from Maharashtra